The 1988 Tour de France was the 75th edition of the Tour de France, taking place from 4 to 24 July. The race was won by Pedro Delgado with the top three positions at the end of the race being occupied by specialist climbers. This Tour was nearly 1,000 km shorter than the previous few editions, which were over 4,000 km, but by no means easier as it included five consecutive mountain stages including a mountain time trial.

The points classification was won by Eddy Planckaert, while Steven Rooks won the mountains classification and the combination classification. The young rider classification was won by Erik Breukink, and Frans Maassen won the intermediate sprints classification. Both team classifications were won by the PDM team. During the race, Delgado failed a doping test, but because the product was not yet on the doping list from the Union Cycliste International, he was not penalised.

Teams

The UCI had also introduced a rule that limited the number of cyclists in a race to 200. In 1987, the Tour had started with 207 cyclists, so because of this rule, the number of teams in the 1988 Tour was reduced from 23 to 22, of 9 riders, a total of 198. 22 teams were announced two weeks before the Tour.

Of the 198 cyclists starting the race, 42 were riding the Tour de France for the first time. The average age of riders in the race was 27.56 years, ranging from the 21-year-old Jean-Claude Colotti to the 39-year-old Hennie Kuiper. The  cyclists had the youngest average age while the riders on  had the oldest.

The teams entering the race were:

Pre-race favourites

The winner of the 1987 Tour de France, Stephen Roche, was unable to defend his title as he was coming back from knee surgeries. The winner from 1986, Greg LeMond, had still not fully recovered from the hunting accident that caused him to miss the 1987 Tour, and did not start this Tour. Remaining favourites were Pedro Delgado, who had finished in second place in 1987, and Andrew Hampsten, the winner of the 1988 Giro d'Italia, several weeks before the Tour.

Route and stages

The Union Cycliste Internationale (UCI) introduced the rule that a cycling race could not span three weekends. The Tour de France could therefore only start on Monday 4 July, and the prologue was removed. The Tour organisers were not happy with this, and they extended the Tour by adding a 'prelude' or 'preface' to the race, circumventing the rule by making it unofficial. The recorded times were not used for the rest of the Tour, but the cyclist with the fastest time would wear the yellow jersey in the next stage.

Since 1910, Belgian cyclists had won at least one stage in every Tour, but in 1988 they did not win any stages. There was one rest day, during which the cyclists were transferred from Villard-de-Lans to Blagnac.

Race overview

The prelude was won by Guido Bontempi, and the first official stage was won by Steve Bauer. Bauer lost the lead in the next stage, a Team Time Trial, to Teun van Vliet. The favourites for the overall victory did not lose time in the first stages. The individual time trial of stage six did not change that, although some outsiders (Sean Kelly and Laurent Fignon) lost two minutes.

In the eleventh stage, in hilly conditions, the first serious attacks were seen. Most contenders were able to stay in the main group, but Laurent Fignon and Jean-François Bernard lost a lot of time and were no longer seen as contenders. The twelfth stage included higher climbs. Delgado escaped on the climb of the Glandon, and he was joined by Steven Rooks. On the descent, they were joined by Gert-Jan Theunisse and Fabio Parra; the other cyclists were unable to get to them. Close to the finish, Rooks escaped and won the stage, and Delgado became the new leader of the general classification. Delgado won the next stage, an uphill individual time trial, and solidified his lead.

In the fourteenth stage, the favourites stayed together, and other cyclists were allowed to go for the stage victory. Philippe Bouvatier and Robert Millar, who had led over the previous two cols, were in the uphill sprint to win, until Bouvatier allowed himself to be misdirected by a gendarme 200 metres before the finish (at the point where the team cars were separated from the cyclists) followed by Millar, and the victory went to Massimo Ghirotto. Ghirotto offered his prize (a new car) to Bouvatier though Millar maintained he would have overhauled Bouvatier to win and told CyclingNews in 2010 that "I don't know if the gendarme was to blame, I don't think he was, I know I would have come round Bouvatier in the sprint but then I ought to have dropped him before we got to that stage".

In the fifteenth stage, Delgado increased his lead. He let Laudelino Cubino get away and claim the victory, because Cubino was no threat for the general classification, and finished in third place, gaining time on all his direct competitors. Delgado further increased his lead in the nineteenth stage, by leaving the other cyclists behind him on the final climb of the day. Delgado was aiming to win the twenty-first stage, an individual time trial, and was leading at all the intermediate check points, but lost time in the final part of the stage, finishing in fourth place. This was more than enough to secure the overall victory.

Doping
During the race, it was announced that doping tests of Pedro Delgado and Gert-Jan Theunisse indicated they had used doping products.

In Delgado's case, it was probenecid. Probenecid was a doping product according to the International Olympic Committee not yet on the doping list of the Union Cycliste Internationale (UCI), so Delgado was not sanctioned, and he remained the winner of the Tour. Tour director Louy tried to convince Delgado to leave the race voluntarily, but Delgado refused. Delgado admits that he took probenecid, but with the intention to assist the kidneys, not to mask anabolic steroids.

Theunisse was found to have a high testosterone-level, which was on the UCI doping list. Theunisse received a penalty of ten minutes, which dropped him from fifth place to eleventh place in the general classification.

One other cyclist was penalised during this Tour: Spanish cyclist Roque de la Cruz failed a doping test after the sixth stage, and was given the same penalty as Theunisse.

In 2013, a notebook from the team doctor of the PDM team showed that all but one of the PDM cyclist were given doping in the 1988 Tour de France.

The owners of the Tour de France thought that director Louy had handled the Delgado affair in the wrong way, and they fired him later that year. They appointed Jean-Marie Leblanc as his replacement.

Classification leadership and minor prizes

There were several classifications in the 1988 Tour de France, six of them awarding jerseys to their leaders. The most important was the general classification, calculated by adding each cyclist's finishing times on each stage. The cyclist with the least accumulated time was the race leader, identified by the yellow jersey; the winner of this classification is considered the winner of the Tour.

Additionally, there was a points classification, where cyclists were given points for finishing among the best in a stage finish, or in intermediate sprints. The cyclist with the most points lead the classification, and was identified with a green jersey.

There was also a mountains classification. The organisation had categorised some climbs as either hors catégorie, first, second, third, or fourth-category; points for this classification were won by the first cyclists that reached the top of these climbs first, with more points available for the higher-categorised climbs. The cyclist with the most points lead the classification, and wore a white jersey with red polka dots.

There was also a combination classification. This classification was calculated as a combination of the other classifications, its leader wore the combination jersey.

Another classification was the intermediate sprints classification. This classification had similar rules as the points classification, but only points were awarded on intermediate sprints. Its leader wore a red jersey.

The sixth individual classification was the young rider classification. This was decided the same way as the general classification, but only riders under 25 years were eligible, and the leader wore a white jersey.

For the team classification, the times of the best three cyclists per team on each stage were added; the leading team was the team with the lowest total time. The riders in the team that led this classification were identified by yellow caps. For the last time, there was also a team points classification. Cyclists received points according to their finishing position on each stage, with the first rider receiving one point. The first three finishers of each team had their points combined, and the team with the fewest points led the classification. The riders of the team leading this classification wore green caps.

In addition, there was a combativity award given after each mass-start stage to the cyclist considered most combative. The decision was made by a jury composed of journalists who gave points. The cyclist with the most points from votes in all stages led the combativity classification. Jérôme Simon won this classification, and was given overall the super-combativity award. The Souvenir Henri Desgrange was given in honour of Tour founder Henri Desgrange to the first rider to pass the summit of the Col du Tourmalet on stage 15. This prize was won by Laudelino Cubino.

Final standings

General classification

Points classification

Mountains classification

Young rider classification

Combination classification

Intermediate sprints classification

Team classification

Team points classification

Combativity classification

References

Bibliography

Further reading

External links

 
1988 in road cycling
1988 in French sport
1988
July 1988 sports events in Europe